Kigeli I Mukobanya was Mwami of the Kingdom of Rwanda from 1378 C.E to 1418 C.E.
His reign was characterized by the infiltration and surprise attack near his Kigali hill palace by the army of King Cwamali of Bunyoro in Uganda.
Kigeli I together with his son Sekarongoro I staged a defensive fight against Cwamali's army around what is modern-day Kigali city. Sekarongoro I Mutabazi got injured on the forehead and bled which led Rwanda army to retreat.
King Kigeli I Mukobanya withdrew from his palace with his cows and re-positioned across Nyabarongo River. Cwamali's army burnt his house and planted a victory tree at Runda. They then crossed the river and pursued Kigeli I. This time Kigeli I Mukobanya's army had reorganized itself and returned a powerful counteroffensive. Bunyoro army suffered numerous casualties and a huge defeat. Some were captured as prisoners of war. The Banyoro captives had their fingers and toes mutilated and sent back to Bunyoro as a message to instill fear into King Cwamali. Various independent scholars, describe Kigeli I Mukobanya to have conquered and ruled Bunyoro and Buganda as he is believed to be listed as Kigala Mukabya in Buganda oral history.

Rwandan kings
1418 deaths